The Oué Pouanlotch River is a river of New Caledonia. It has a catchment area of 92 square kilometres.

The surrounding area is that of tropical rain forest.

See also
List of rivers of New Caledonia

References

Rivers of New Caledonia